Mathews Tuya is a tuya in northcentral British Columbia. It is one of the six tuyas close to Tuya Lake. It has been partly glaciated and Ar-Ar geochronology shows that is it about 730,000 years old. It mainly comprises palagonitized tephra (tuff, lapilli tuff, tuff-breccia) but also has a few dykes and jointed lava flows on its flanks. The top still has flat-lying lava flows erupted after the tephra pile grew above the surface of the enclosing lake. The other volcanoes in the area include Tuya Butte, South Tuya and Ash Mountain. The volcanoes in the region form part of the Northern Cordilleran Volcanic Province.

See also
 List of volcanoes in Canada
 List of Northern Cordilleran volcanoes
 Volcanism of Canada
 Volcanism of Western Canada

References
Edwards, B. R., Russell, J. K. and Simpson, K. 2011. Volcanology and petrology of Mathews Tuya, northern British Columbia: glaciovolcanic constraints on interpretations of the 0.730 Ma Cordilleran paleoclimate. Bulletin of Volcanology. 73:479-496. DOI 10.1007/s00445-010-0418-z

Volcanoes of British Columbia
One-thousanders of British Columbia
Subglacial mounds of Canada
Cassiar Country
Stikine Ranges
Pleistocene volcanoes
Monogenetic volcanoes
Northern Cordilleran Volcanic Province